This list of parks in Ponce, Puerto Rico, consists of the parks in the municipality of Ponce, Puerto Rico. Passive as well as active parks are included; but recreational-use only parks, such as baseball stadiums, are omitted. Public parks maintained by both the municipal government as well as the central island government are listed.

Park list summary table

External links

 
 USGS Geographic Names Information Service

Parks, Ponce
 
Parks
Ponce